Clarence Brooks (May 20, 1951 – September 17, 2016) was an American football coach. He was the defensive line coach of the Baltimore Ravens from 2005 to 2015. He also served as an assistant coach for the Chicago Bears, Cleveland Browns and Miami Dolphins.

Brooks won Super Bowl XLVII as part of the Ravens' coaching staff.

He died of esophageal cancer on September 17, 2016, in Weston, Florida at age 65.

References

1951 births
2016 deaths
UMass Minutemen football coaches
Syracuse Orange football coaches
Arizona Wildcats football coaches
Chicago Bears coaches
Cleveland Browns coaches
Miami Dolphins coaches
Baltimore Ravens coaches
Deaths from cancer in Florida